Clover Mountains Wilderness is a  large wilderness area southeast of Caliente, Nevada in southeast Lincoln County's border region with southwest Utah.

The wilderness comprises much of the Clover Mountains and has biome influences from the Tule Desert adjacent to the southeast. It also lies in a border region on the Great Basin Divide, at the northeast of the Mojave Desert and the south-southeast of the Great Basin regions.

Description
The large Clover Mountain region contains numerous spires, rock outcrops, meandering canyons, and perennial streams.

Geology
The Clover Mountains Wilderness is a former volcanic region. It contains rhyolite with various colors, pink, red, yellow, orange and browns. Numerous spires, rock outcrops, meandering canyons, and perennial streams occur in the region.

Flora and fauna
The Clover Mountains Wilderness contains stands of Ponderosa Pine and Quaking Aspen. The southern portion of the wilderness contains species from the Tule Desert (Nevada), sagebrush and Joshua Trees.

Some fauna of the region include mountain lion, badger, bobcat, Desert Bighorn Sheep, prairie falcon, and golden eagles.

See also
List of U.S. Wilderness Areas
List of wilderness areas in Nevada

References

External links
Clover Mountains Wilderness
Clover Mountains Wilderness Area, BLM
Clover Mountains Wilderness, wilderness.net
Clover Mountains
Clover Mountains-(trails), at trails.com

Protected areas of Lincoln County, Nevada
Wilderness areas of Nevada
IUCN Category Ib
Bureau of Land Management areas in Nevada
Protected areas established in 2004
2004 establishments in Nevada